Falsamblesthis ibiyara is a species of beetle in the family Cerambycidae. It was described by Marinoni in 1978. It is known from Brazil.

References

Forsteriini
Beetles described in 1978